State Highway 53 (SH 53) is a State Highway in Kerala, India that starts in Mundur and ends by Perinthalmanna. The highway is 48.1 km long.

The Route Map 
Mundur junction - Kongad - Cherpulassery(Pattambi - Cherpulassery road joins) - Thootha - Perinthalmanna - joins SH 23

See also 
Roads in Kerala
List of State Highways in Kerala

References 

State Highways in Kerala
Roads in Palakkad district